Petseri County was a county of Estonia established in 1918. Since 1944, however, most of the county has been administered as Pechorsky District of Pskov Oblast, first by the Russian SFSR and then, from 1991, by Russia. Estonia retains territories that today constitute Setomaa Parish in modern Võru County.

History
The territorial composition of the whole historic province of Petseri County (Petserimaa) is regarded as the homeland of the Setos, a Balto-Finnic people related to Estonians. The Russian inhabitants of Petseri district were mainly Old Believers who spoke a transitional dialect between Russian and the Belarusian language. In the mid-15th century one of the most important Russian Orthodox monasteries, the Pskovo-Pechersky Monastery, was founded in the area.

During the last year of World War I, from February to December 1918, the county's capital, Pechory, was occupied by German forces. (As such, the county including the town and the territory surrounding it was devised to be part of the Baltic Duchy.) The town was then captured by Estonian forces on March 29, 1919, during the Estonian War of Independence. The Treaty of Tartu of 1920 subsequently assigned Pechory and its surrounding territory, the Setomaa region, to Estonia. Pechory was renamed Petseri and the area became Petseri County. Saint Peter's Lutheran Church was built in 1926 at Petseri.

During World War II, the county was occupied by the German army between August 1941 and August 11, 1944, and then by Soviet forces during their advance toward Nazi Germany. Soviet authorities transferred most of Petseri county from the Estonian SSR to the Russian SFSR in 1944.

After Estonia regained independence from the Soviet Union in August 1991, Estonia raised the question of a return to the borders under the Treaty of Tartu: Estonia dropped this claim in November 1995, however.  Estonia and Russia signed the Estonian-Russian Border Treaty on May 18, 2005:  the preamble noted that the international border had partly changed, in accordance with Article 122 of the Estonian Constitution.

See also
 Estonia–Russia border
 Estonian–Russian territorial dispute
 Pechory
 Pechorsky District
 Setos, Setomaa

Notes and references

Former counties of Estonia
1920 establishments in Estonia
Pskov Oblast